Vini is a genus of birds in the family Psittaculidae that are endemic to the islands of the tropical Pacific. There are eleven extant species of these small lorikeets ranging from the Bismark Archipelago through Fiji, Samoa, French Polynesia, and as far east as Henderson Island. All members of the genus have exceptional bright plumage, particularly the unusual all over blues of the blue lorikeet and the ultramarine lorikeet.

The Vini lorikeets are highly threatened by human changes to their islands. Most species have been lost from a number of islands and two species became extinct before the arrival of European explorers in the Pacific. , two species are listed as endangered species by the IUCN and two are considered vulnerable. They are primarily threatened by introduced species, such as rats, and habitat loss.

Taxonomy
The genus Vini was introduced in 1833 by the French naturalist René Lesson for Kuhl's lorikeet. The genus name is the Tahitian word for a local bird.

This genus formerly included only the blue-crowned, ultramarine, Stephen's, Kuhl's, and blue lorikeets (as well as the extinct Sinoto's and conquered lorikeets); the collared lory was formerly placed in the monotypic genus Phigys, and the remaining five species were placed in Charmosyna. A molecular phylogenetic study of the lorikeets published in 2020 led to a revision of the generic boundaries.

Species
The genus contains 11 species:

Fossils 
 †Sinoto's lorikeet, Vini sinotoi (extinct)
 †Conquered lorikeet, Vini vidivici (extinct)

References

 
Bird genera
Parrots of Oceania
Taxa named by René Lesson